The 2015 Billboard Music Awards ceremony was held on May 17, 2015, at the MGM Grand Garden Arena in Las Vegas. It was aired live on ABC. The show was hosted by Ludacris and Chrissy Teigen.

Taylor Swift won 8 out of her 14 nominations, including Top Artist, Top Female Artist and Top Billboard 200 Album for 1989. Other winners included Sam Smith, Iggy Azalea and Pharrell Williams scoring three trophies each. Meghan Trainor, One Direction, Jason Aldean, John Legend, Enrique Iglesias and Hozier won two categories. Swift premiered her "Bad Blood" music video at the start of the show. Mariah Carey performed at the ceremony, marking the first time she has performed on the Billboard stage since 1998.

Performers

Presenters 
  
 Taylor Swift, Ellen Pompeo, Zendaya, Lily Aldridge, Hailee Steinfeld, Martha Hunt – Introduced Van Halen
   
 Lily Aldridge & Charli XCX – Presented Top Duo/Group
   
 Laverne Cox & Tracee Ellis Ross – Presented Top Billboard 200 Album
   
 Chrissy Teigen – Introduced Fall Out Boy & Wiz Khalifa
   
 Kaitlyn Bristowe & Britt Nilsson from The Bachelorette – Introduced Nick Jonas
   
 Chrissy Teigen – Introduced Meghan Trainor & John Legend
   
 Idina Menzel – Introduced Mariah Carey
   
 Danica McKellar – Presented Top Rap Song
   
 Ludacris & Tyrese Gibson – Introduced Wiz Khalifa, Charlie Puth, and Lindsey Stirling
   
 Celine Dion – Presented Top Male Artist
   
 Taraji P. Henson – Introduced Jussie Smollett, Bryshere 'Yazz' Gray, and Estelle
   
 One Direction – Presented Top Radio Song
   
 Florida Georgia Line – Introduced Little Big Town & Faith Hill
   
 Ellen Pompeo – Presented Top Female Artist
   
 Kira Kazantsev & Pete Wentz – Presented Top Touring Artist
   
 Jennifer Lopez – Introduced Pitbull & Chris Brown
   
 Zendaya – Introduced Ed Sheeran
   
 50 Cent & Rita Ora – Presented Top Hot 100 Song
   
 Prince Royce – Presented Billboard Chart Achievement Award 
   
 Fifth Harmony – Introduced Nicki Minaj & David Guetta
   
 Molly Ringwald – Introduced Simple Minds
   
 Pentatonix – Introduced Kelly Clarkson
   
 Brett Eldredge & Hailee Steinfeld – Presented Top Country Artist
   
 John Legend – Introduced Imagine Dragons
   
 Kevin Connolly, Kevin Dillon, Jerry Ferrara, and Adrian Grenier – Presented Top Artist Award
   
 Kendall Jenner & Kylie Jenner – Introduced Kanye West
   
 Ludacris – Introduced Britney Spears & Iggy Azalea

Winners and nominees
Winners are listed first.

Artists with multiple wins and nominations

References

External links
 Official awards website

2015
Billboard awards
2015 in American music
2015 in Nevada
2015 music awards
MGM Grand Garden Arena